Chen Zijie (Chinese: 陈子介; Pinyin: Chén Zǐjiè; born 24 December 1989) is a Chinese footballer who plays for Zibo Qisheng in China League Two.

Club career
Chen Zijie began his football career when he played for Shaanxi National Power's youth team and in 2007, he moved to Shaanxi Baorong Chanba's youth team after his previous club dissolved. He was then loaned to China League Two club Shaanxi Star for one season. Chen was promoted to Shaanxi Baorong Chanba (later moved to Guizhou and renamed Guizhou Renhe)'s first team squad by Cheng Yaodong in 2009, however, as Shaanxi struggled at the bottom of the league, he did not appear for the club in the 2009 league season.

Chen was loaned to China League One club Shanghai East Asia for the 2011 season. Although he just made ten appearances in the league, Shanghai East Asia extended his loan deal for an additional year in 2012. On 8 April 2012, he scored his first goal for Shanghai East Asia in a 2–0 home victory against Yanbian Changbai Tiger. He played 25 matches and scored three goals in the second tier that season as Shanghai East Asia won the 2012 China League One titles and were promoted to the top flight. Chen returned to Guizhou after 2012 league season, but in July 2013, he was loaned to third-tier side Hebei Zhongji until 31 December 2013.

On 16 February 2014, Chen made his debut for Guizhou in the 2014 Chinese FA Super Cup against Guangzhou Evergrande with 1–0 victory, coming on as a substitute for the injured Zlatan Muslimović in the 59th minute. His first tier debut came on 8 March 2014, in the first league match of the season in a goalless away draw against Jiangsu Sainty. On 15 March 2014, he scored his first goal for Guizhou in a 2–0 home win over Tianjin Teda.

On 7 February 2015, Chen signed a four-year contract with China League One side Hunan Billows. In February 2017, he transferred to Super League side Henan Jianye after Hunan relegated to the third tier. He made his debut for Henan on 7 April 2017 in a 1–0 away defeat against Beijing Guoan, coming on as a substitute for Christian Bassogog in the 75th minute. On 3 May 2017, he scored his first goal for the club in a 5–1 away win against League Two club Shanghai Sunfun in the 2017 Chinese FA Cup.

International career
Chen made his debut for the Chinese national team on 18 June 2014 in a 2-0 win against Macedonia.

Career statistics 
Statistics accurate as of match played 31 December 2019.

Honours

Club
Shanghai East Asia
China League One: 2012

Guizhou Renhe
Chinese FA Super Cup: 2014

References

Living people
1989 births
Sportspeople from Xi'an
Chinese footballers
Footballers from Shaanxi
Beijing Renhe F.C. players
Shanghai Port F.C. players
Hebei F.C. players
Hunan Billows players
Henan Songshan Longmen F.C. players
Association football forwards
China international footballers
Chinese Super League players
China League One players